Arthrobacter gyeryongensis is a Gram-positive and rod-shaped bacterium species from the genus Arthrobacter which has been isolated from soil from a field with Gynostemma pentaphyllum plants.

References 

Bacteria described in 2014
Micrococcaceae